Here Comes the Indian is the first album by the American experimental pop band Animal Collective under that name, released June 17, 2003 on Paw Tracks. It is the first release by the group on which all four members perform together: Avey Tare (David Portner), Panda Bear (Noah Lennox), Geologist (Brian Weitz), and Deakin (Josh Dibb). Three earlier albums released by various combinations of these musicians were not billed as Animal Collective until later; the 2003 album is now considered the band's fourth. 

In 2020, the band renamed the album Ark because they felt the first title objectified Native Americans.

Reception

Reviewing Here Comes the Indian for Stylus Magazine, Ed Howard afforded the album favorable comparisons to Boredoms' Super æ and Vision Creation Newsun. The Rolling Stone Album Guide described the album as more "claustrophobic" than earlier releases by Animal Collective. Uncuts reviewer compared the band to the Residents, "whose absurdist humour the AC also shares".

2020 reissue
On July 2, 2020, following a reissue of the band's discography on Bandcamp, the group announced that the album's title would be changed to Ark, explaining that "having the word 'Indian' in [their] record title sends the wrong message by objectifying the American Indian people." As the band has "drawn countless inspiration  from Indigenous people in America and around the world", they will also be donating a portion of the royalties from the album to Seeding Sovereignty, an indigenous rights and environmental justice charity.

Track listing

Personnel
 Avey Tare
 Panda Bear
 Geologist
 Deakin
 Nicolas Vernhes – engineer

References

External links
Review by Rod Smith of Minneapolis City Pages
Fat cats Animal Collective and Black Dice pounce on Austin by Andrew Ward of The Daily Texan

2003 debut albums
Animal Collective albums
New Weird America albums